The Connecticut River Walk is partially constructed park and bikeway in Springfield, Massachusetts, United States, along the banks of New England's largest river, the Connecticut River. Unusual features of the trail include its path alongside an active train line, making it a "rail-with-trail," and its passing in very close proximity to the Naismith Memorial Basketball Hall of Fame. The longest river in New England, the Connecticut River is the Knowledge Corridor's most prominent natural asset. For centuries it has been a source of regional identity and pride; however, currently most residents are cut off from it by Interstate 91 - a 1960s-era elevated highway, which has become a major inhibitor to Springfield's economic and recreational riverfront growth, especially in recent years.

Proposed additions
The Connecticut River Walk and Bikeway is under development, and the first two sections are open to the public.

Access and Interstate 91
Since the 1960s, Springfielders have been cut off from the economic and recreational development opportunities of the Connecticut River by Interstate 91. Connecticut River Walk & Bikeway was conceived to revitalize the Connecticut Riverfront, restoring it as a focus of life in the region. Interstate 91 and its tangential developments—for example, above-grade parking lots built underneath it; tall, earthen, grassy mounds constructed beside it; and even double-sided,  limestone walls between the city and the river—pose formidable barriers to pedestrians reaching the Connecticut River Walk from Metro Center, Springfield, Massachusetts.

The  park features three entrance points, including a  footbridge behind LA Fitness in the Basketball Hall of Fame complex. In 2011, on Wednesdays at 12:15pm, the city of Springfield holds "lunchtime walks" to promote the park.

In 2010, Boston's Urban Land Institute proposed a vision for reuniting Springfield with its riverfront; however, as of 2011, Interstate 91 remains a physical barrier between Springfield, the Connecticut River, and the Basketball Hall of Fame.

References

Parks in Springfield, Massachusetts